Neil Speirs (born 18 January 1979) is a Scottish international lawn bowler.

Bowls career
He competed for Scotland in the men's fours at the 2014 Commonwealth Games where he won a gold medal.

He had won the gold medal at the 2006 World Cup Singles in Warilla, New South Wales, Australia and in 2015 he won the triples gold medal and fours silver medal at the Atlantic Bowls Championships.

References

1979 births
Living people
Bowls players at the 2010 Commonwealth Games
Bowls players at the 2014 Commonwealth Games
Commonwealth Games gold medallists for Scotland
Scottish male bowls players
Sportspeople from Edinburgh
Commonwealth Games medallists in lawn bowls
Medallists at the 2014 Commonwealth Games